Venugopal Dhoot (born in Mumbai, India) is an Indian businessman. According to Forbes magazine, his wealth in 2015 was $1.19 billion, the 61st richest person in India. He is the founder, chairman and managing director of Videocon. He was arrested by the CBI on 26 Dec 2022 in the ICICI Bank Fraud case.

Controversies
In April 2018, authorities have issued a lookout circular (LOC) for Dhoot, Chanda Kochhar and her husband Deepak Kochhar. The LOC was issued due to Central Bureau of Investigation (CBI) investigations into irregularities concerning a  loan made from ICICI Bank to Videocon Group and the use of shell companies and a quid pro quo arrangement in the case of a  loan by Dhoot of Videocon to NuPower Renewables, a company which is owned by Deepak Kochhar.

In January 2023 he was granted interim bail by the Bombay High Court on the grounds that his arrest was not in compliance with the law.

References

External links
 Venugopal Dhoot on Forbes

Indian billionaires
Businesspeople from Mumbai
Rajasthani people
Living people
1951 births